The 2022 Open International Féminin de Montpellier was a professional tennis tournament played on outdoor clay courts. It was the sixteenth edition of the tournament which was part of the 2022 ITF Women's World Tennis Tour. It took place in Montpellier, France between 27 June and 3 July 2022.

Champions

Singles

  Oksana Selekhmeteva def.  Kateryna Baindl, 6–3, 5–7, 7–5

Doubles

  Andrea Gámiz /  Andrea Lázaro García def.  Estelle Cascino /  Irina Khromacheva, 6–4, 2–6, [13–11]

Singles main draw entrants

Seeds

 1 Rankings are as of 20 June 2022.

Other entrants
The following players received wildcards into the singles main draw:
  Yaroslava Bartashevich
  Lucie Nguyen Tan
  Alice Robbe
  Margot Yerolymos

The following player received entry using a protected ranking:
  Kateryna Baindl

The following players received entry from the qualifying draw:
  Mirra Andreeva
  Sara Cakarevic
  Andrea Gámiz
  Alexandra Osborne
  Alice Ramé
  Ioana Loredana Roșca
  Margaux Rouvroy
  Diana Shnaider

The following player received entry as a lucky loser:
  Léa Tholey

References

External links
 2022 Open International Féminin de Montpellier at ITFtennis.com
 Official website

2022 ITF Women's World Tennis Tour
2022 in French tennis
June 2022 sports events in France
July 2022 sports events in France